Zalaszombatfa is a village in Zala County, Hungary.

External links 
 Street map 
 hetesifalvak.hu

References

Populated places in Zala County